The Kaufman Kings were a minor league baseball team based in Kaufman, Texas. In 1915, the Kings played as members of the Class D level Central Texas League in the only season of minor league baseball hosted in Kaufman.

History
Minor league baseball started in Kaufman, Texas in 1915. The Kaufman Kings played their only minor league season as members of the six–team Class D level Central Texas League, which folded during the season. After beginning league play on May 17, 1915, the Central Texas League folded on July 24, 1915. The Corsicana A's, Ennis Tigers,  Mexia Gassers and Terrell Cubs and Waxahachie Athletics teams joined Kaufman in league play.

In 1915, the Kings were involved in two no-hitters. On May 27, 1915 Corsicana A's pitcher Erwin threw a no–hit game against the Kaufman Kings in a 2–0 Corsicana victory. Kaufman pitcher Josh Billings pitched a no–hit game on July 15, 1915. Billings threw his no–hitter against the Ennis Tigers in a 4–0 Kaufman Kings victory.

On July 24, 1915 the Central Texas League folded before the conclusion of the season. At the time the league folded, the Kaufman Kings were in 3rd place with a 30–32 overall record, playing under manager Dee Poindexter. Kaufman finished 5.5 games behind the 1st place Ennis Tigers in the six–team standings.

Kaufman, Texas has not hosted another minor league team.

The ballpark
The Kaufman Kings are noted to have likely hosted home games at the site of today's Shannon Park. Shannon Park was named in 1937 and is still in use today as a public park. Shannon Park is located at the Barnes Street & Shannon Street, Kaufman, Texas.

Year–by–year record

Notable alumni
No Kaufman King alumni played Major League baseball.

References

External links
Baseball Reference

Defunct minor league baseball teams
Professional baseball teams in Texas
Defunct baseball teams in Texas
Baseball teams established in 1915
Baseball teams disestablished in 1915
1915 establishments in Texas
Kaufman County, Texas
Central Texas League teams
1915 disestablishments in Texas